Graduated driver licensing systems (GDLS) are designed to provide new drivers of motor vehicles with driving experience and skills gradually over time in low-risk environments. There are typically three steps or stages through which new drivers pass. They begin by acquiring a learner's permit, progress to a restricted, probationary or provisional license, followed by receipt of a full driver's license. Graduated drivers' licensing generally restricts nighttime, expressway, and unsupervised driving during initial stages, but lifts these restrictions with time and further testing of the individual, eventually concluding with the individual attaining a full driver's license.

Overview
Acquiring a learner's permit typically requires a minimum age and passing vision and knowledge (written) tests. These tests usually assess the participant's knowledge of road signs and how to deal with hypothetical situations (e.g. junctions) while on the road. Parental or guardian permission may be required if below a specified age. Those who hold a learner's permit must generally drive under the supervision of a licensed driver that meets the requirements of a supervisor, not be affected by alcohol or other drugs, and there may be restrictions imposed on maximum speed that a learner driver can drive, the types of road that can be driven, and even on the use of mobile phones (cell phones). There may also be limits imposed on the number of passengers in the vehicle, and learner drivers may be required to be free of moving violations and at-fault accidents or crashes for a minimum period of time before moving to the next stage. In many jurisdictions a learner driver is required to display an L sign clearly on the vehicle to indicate to other road users that training and supervised driving is being undertaken. Learner drivers may also be required to complete a logbook of their driving experience, which must be certified or countersigned by a supervising driver or driver trainer.

The transition for a learner license to an intermediate, provisional or probationary license typically requires a minimum age and usually requires the learner driver to pass an on-road driving test, although in some jurisdictions there may be alternative licensing paths offered involving a continuous process of competency based training and assessment under the guidance and instruction of an accredited driver trainer.

Those who receive an intermediate, provisional or probationary license may drive without supervision, although driving at certain times (typically after midnight until around sunrise) and driving with passengers in the vehicle may require the presence of a supervising driver who is fully licensed. Drivers typically must remain free of moving violations and at-fault accidents for a specified period of time. In some places, drivers with these licenses must have no alcohol or other drugs in their blood while they are driving, and may be restricted to certain maximum speeds and from using mobile phones. In some jurisdictions, an intermediate, provisional or probationary driver is required to display a P sign on the outside of the vehicle to indicate to other road users and police of their license status (and hence of restrictions that may apply).

Receipt of a full drivers license typically requires a specific minimum age, a minimum time period of driving experience, and may require the passing of a final road test of driving skills or the passing of a hazard perception test.

The first graduated driver licensing systems involving a learner licensing phase, an intermediate, provisional or probationary licensing phase, and full licensing were developed in Australia in the 1960s, but the advocacy of graduated driver licensing in North America is associated with Professor Patricia Waller, of the University of North Carolina Injury Prevention Research Center and later the University of Michigan Transportation Research Institute, commencing in the 1970s.

North American graduated driver licensing systems emerged in the late 1980s and 1990s (and were heavily influenced by a revamped graduated licensing system introduced in New Zealand in the 1980s, itself based on Waller's writings), and have now been adopted in almost all US and Canadian jurisdictions. These systems place particular emphases on passenger restrictions and night time driving curfews for young drivers.

In contrast, the approach of European graduated driver licensing systems places much greater emphasis on the training experiences of learner drivers prior to solo driving, with a lesser focus on license restrictions at the intermediate, provisional or probationary licensing phase. Young drivers in European graduated driver licensing systems are typically older, as minimum licensing ages are older than most other countries. As well, most learner driver experience is obtained through professional driving instructors rather than through ad hoc supervision.

The Australian approaches to graduated driver licensing reflect and extend the thinking underpinning the North American and European approaches, combining restrictions on young drivers with intensive training requirements but also adding significant enforcement (zero tolerance with regard to speeding, driving while impaired by alcohol or other drugs, and the use of mobile telephones by young drivers) and penalty components (particularly the suspension of a drivers license for offenses, the impounding of motor vehicles, and opportunities to attend traffic offender intervention programs as part of the penalty process). As in Europe, minimum licensing ages in Australian graduated driver licensing systems are older than in the North American graduated driver licensing systems, and most learner drivers in Australia also receive driver training from professional driving instructors as well as practice under informal driving supervision. Critical features of the Australian graduated driver licensing systems are the mandatory display of L and P plates on the front and back of vehicles driven by learner drivers and provisionally licensed drivers, and the compulsory carriage of a drivers license which facilitates police identification of young drivers and their vehicles.

Graduated licensing and insurance
The automobile insurance industry generally supports graduated licensing. However, some youth rights advocates have accused insurance companies of charging premiums to new and young drivers in GDL jurisdictions that are not substantially less than premiums in non-GDL jurisdictions, even though graduated licensing supposedly reduces the risk of accidents. This issue is generally restricted to jurisdictions with private auto insurance. Most state-run automobile insurance schemes do not discriminate on account of age or driving experience.

Africa

South Africa

In South Africa, a time-based graduated licensing system is used. To attain a full driving license, an individual must first attain a 'Learner's license'. The individual must be 16 to obtain a motor cycle learner's licence; 17 years old to be able to attain a learner's license to operate a 'light motor vehicle', and 18 years old to be able to attain a learner's license to operate a heavy duty motor vehicle. Once the learner's license is issued, the individual has two years to attain their full license. The K53 system is the correct standard. The K53 manuals may be located on the Arrive Alive website. It is recommended that learner drivers secure the assistance of a qualified, professional driving instructor.

There are three different categories of learner licenses:
 Code 1: motorcycles with an engine capacity below 125cc
 Code 2: motor vehicles (except motorcycles) with gross vehicle mass of 3 500 kilograms or less
 Code 3: all vehicles (except motorcycles) with a gross vehicle mass exceeding 3500 kg, you will need to be 18 years of age or older

Asia

Hong Kong
Hong Kong uses a graduated licensing system regardless of the driver's age. A new license of private cars (1), mini vans (2) and motorcycles (3) uses provisional license system called Probationary Driving Licence. While the others have extra requirements upon licensing.

However, drivers already having No.2 licenses for at least 3 years, with no less than two years of non-provisional driving license may be exempted from the probation or No.1 license (but not vice versa).

Driver on probation must comply with a 12-month minimum restricted period. They must comply the following rule while driving on the respected vehicles
Placing a proper white plate with red letter "P" in front and rear of the vehicle
The speed limit is 70 km/h or the road's speed limit, lower if applicable
Cannot drive on the overtaking lane on highways
Cannot carry passengers (for motorcyclists only)

Probation period will be extended for 6 months if mild driving regulations are violated, and the probation license voided for severe violation or 2 mild violation. This rule also applies while driving on vehicles not on probation.

For the licenses other than 1,2,3, the applicant must comply all of the requirements below upon application, which are:
Over the age of 21
Is a Hong Kong permanent resident, or not subjected to any condition of stay
Have been driven in Hong Kong or recognized area for 3 years for cars or mini vans, and should have no less than 2 years for non-provisional driving license
Have no designated traffic offence record for past 5 years
Are fulfilled with other extra requirements, if any.

Europe

Germany
In Germany, there are two elements of the graduated driver licensing scheme: 
 At the age of 17, a new driver is allowed to drive accompanied by an experienced driver. The persons who are allowed to accompany the driver, typically the parents,  are listed in the preliminary licence. When the driver becomes 18, the normal licence is sent to the driver without any additional tests. The German term is "Begleitetes Fahren".
 Within the first two years of holding the licence, there is a zero tolerance alcohol limit and a stricter penalisation of traffic rule violations. Some violations will extend the probation time to four years. The German term is "Führerschein auf Probe"

United Kingdom
In the United Kingdom, one may apply for a provisional driver's licence from the age of 15 years 9 months, provided one is a legal resident of Great Britain. In Northern Ireland, legal residents can apply for their provisional from 16 years and 10 months. There is no requirement to sit a theory test before applying for a licence. Residents in Northern Ireland must apply through a separate system. Those holding a provisional driving licence are permitted to learn to drive a car from the age of seventeen years, and sixteen years for a moped or light quad bike.

Holders of a provisional licence must be supervised by someone who is over 21 and has held their full licence for over 3 years. Provisional licence holders in Northern Ireland must not exceed 45 mph. When a learner is driving a car, they must display a red 'L' plate on the front and rear of the vehicle (or a 'D' plate in Wales). Learner drivers of cars (but not motorcycles) may drive on motorways in Great Britain only.

To progress to holding a full licence, a driver must pass a multiple choice theory test on the Highway Code and a video Hazard Perception Test, both of which are sat on a computer under strict examination conditions. Once they have passed both of these tests, the driver can book a practical driving test and must pass this in order to be awarded a full licence. There is no minimum hours requirement for learning to drive, nor a minimum time to hold a licence. Once a learner has passed their driving test, they can drive unaccompanied on public roads. There no probationary period for new drivers, but this is presently under debate and may change in the future.

An optional scheme called "Pass Plus" is available in Great Britain for new drivers after passing their practical driving test; with aim at improving general driving skills, as many lack experience. This course requires driving in a range of conditions and on a variety of roads. It is not a legal requirement, but completion of the course can lead to reduced insurance premium costs for new drivers, however there is no final test as such. The Pass Plus scheme is not available in Northern Ireland.

Sweden
In Sweden, one may apply for a provisional driver's license for personal automobiles from the age of 16 years, providing one has obtained and provided a report on one's medical status, filled out by oneself, and completed and provided an optical exam to the governing body of Transportstyrelsen. While one doesn't need to sit through a theoretical test to qualify, one must sit through a lecture at a licensed driver's school. If and when both the Student and supervisor are licensed, the student may drive on public roads with both the supervisor and student having proof of them being licensed with them, and the car having a sign in the back saying "Övningskör" meaning roughly practice driving, a green one if you're driving privately most often with one's parent or guardian, or a red sign if the student is driving with an instructor from an official driving school.

Whilst driving  the student must be accomplished by another fully licensed driver, who must be 24 years or older, have completed an introductions course that is good for personal automobiles within the last 5 years, their student must also have completed this course, and they must have had a fully fledged driver's license for at least 5 years within the last 10 years.

North America

Canada 
In Canada, each province is responsible for the transportation laws. Most provinces not listed have a system that resembles one of the following graduated licensing programs.

Alberta 

In Alberta, one may obtain their Class 7 learner's licence at 14 which is the beginning stage of the GDL Program. The GDL program lasts four years if the learner's licence is obtained at 14, or three years if obtained at 15. The learner's licence allows a new driver to drive only when accompanied. You must hold a learner's driver's licence (class 7) for at least one year. Learner drivers must abide by the following: You must be accompanied by a fully licensed (non-GDL probationary) driver who is 18 years of age or older and is seated next to you, You are not permitted to drive from midnight to 5 a.m., You are not permitted to have more passengers than seat belts, Your driving privileges will be suspended if you accumulate eight or more demerit points, and You must have zero level of alcohol and drug when driving (or riding a motorcycle).

To obtain your probationary (restricted) licence, you must be at least 16 years of age. You must pass the Alberta Class 5 basic road test. This licence allows you to drive unsupervised and with no curfew restrictions, but there are still some conditions placed on your licence that are similar to the learner's licence. You must still have a zero blood alcohol level while driving, your licence will be suspended if you accumulate eight or more demerit points, and you must hold this licence for a minimum of two years. You also can't be a supervising driver to someone with a learner's licence and you will not be able to re-class your licence to drive commercial vehicles.

To obtain your unrestricted licence, you must be at least 18 years of age. In order to obtain this licence successfully, you must pass the Class 5 Advanced Road Test, which is longer and tests more skills than the basic test. You must also be suspension-free for the last twelve months of the two-year probationary stage. One of the restrictions that are removed are the zero-tolerance rules for alcohol. The permissible blood alcohol limit for fully licensed drivers of legal drinking age, which is 18, is anything below 0.05%.  Moderate sanctions are imposed on drivers who have a BAC between 0.05 and 0.08, such as a three day suspension of your licence, and your vehicle can be impounded for three days with more severe sanctions for repeat offenders. Full criminal sanctions under the Criminal Code start at 0.08 or above. You can also qualify to drive Class 1, 2, 3, or 4 commercial vehicles and increase the demerit points you are allowed before suspension, which is from 8 to 15 and you can now supervise learner licensed drivers.

All new drivers must complete the GDL program regardless of age.

British Columbia 

The Graduated Licensing Program (GLP) was introduced in British Columbia in 1998 and is based on driving experience. A driver who is at least 16 years old and has never driven before must first take a knowledge test and vision screening test to attain their Class 7L (Learners) permit. Upon achieving this, they must be supervised by a full licensed driver of at least 25 years of age when driving. After a minimum of one year, they can take a practical driver's exam (road test). Upon succeeding the driver's exam, they receive their Class 7 N (Novice) licence, which allows them to drive alone, but with several restrictions. After a minimum of two years of safe driving, they may take another practical driver's exam (Class 5 road test), and upon passing, they become a full licensed Class 5 driver.

Novice drivers may even be able to take their Class 5 road test after only 18 months, if they've taken an ICBC approved graduated licensing program during the L stage and have met all other requirements (no at-fault accidents, tickets or driving prohibitions). By successfully completing this ICBC approved driving course, drivers are also eligible to receive two High School credits.

Drivers who have had experience driving outside the province must take the knowledge test and get their learner's permit, but they are allowed to upgrade their status to Novice after a minimum of one day. However, they must similarly wait a period of two years before attempting to gain their full licence. This can apply even if the applicant currently holds an unrestricted licence from another jurisdiction.

Ontario

In Ontario, the graduated licensing system is a time-based process. Once an individual turns 16, he/she is eligible to acquire a class G1 licence, which is the beginning stage. This is done by passing both a knowledge test as well as a vision test. The G1 licence is required by law to be held for 12 months unless he/she takes an approved Driver's Education course, by which the waiting time is dropped to 8 months. A holder of a G1 licence may drive only with a G level (or higher) driver who has 4 years' experience, which includes time as a G2 driver. The G1 licence carries other restrictions, such as a curfew and limiting which high-speed freeways the novice driver is allowed use. The accompanying driver must maintain their blood alcohol content (BAC) under 0.05. At the end of that period, the novice driver can take a G1 exit test which tests basic driving skills. Passing this grants him/her a G2 licence which enables him/her to drive alone with a limited number of passengers in the vehicle unless certain requirements are met (note: the passenger limitation only applies to G2 drivers aged 19 and under between the hours of 12 AM and 5 AM).

G2 licences are kept for 12 months and then he/she can take the G2 exit test, which tests highway driving as well as city driving skills. A G2 licence holder is subject to a new set of restrictions, which are more relaxed than those for the G1 licence: The driver must maintain a BAC of zero, and if the licence holder is 19 years of age or under, time-specific passenger restrictions apply. Passing the G2 exit test grants the Class G licence which is considered a full license in Ontario. This can apply even if the applicant currently holds an unrestricted licence from another jurisdiction. 

There are a few other graduated licensing systems in Ontario, including motorcycles (M1, M2, M) and since 2005, mopeds (for a non-class M license holder) (LM1, LM2).

United States
In the United States, transportation laws are the responsibility of the state governments. The federal government does, however, try to encourage graduated driver licensing through its National Priority Safety Programs fund. The National Transportation Safety Board reported in 2017 that zero dollars were expended on graduated driver licensing through this fund in 2016 (compared to more than $230 million for impaired driving campaigns).

In 2011, the Safe Teen and Novice Driver Uniform Protection (STANDUP) Act (S. 528, H.R. 1515) was introduced in the US Senate on March 9 by Senator Kirsten Gillibrand (D-NY) and in the US House of Representatives on April 14 by Representatives Tim Bishop (D-NY) and Randy Hultgren (R-IL). This legislation would establish minimum federal requirements for state graduated licensing laws.

Alabama
The State of Alabama uses an age-based graduated licensing system. A new driver over the age of 18 does not need to go through the graduated licensing process; they receive their full license after fulfilling requirements (tests and fees). A 15-year-old licensee must be accompanied by a licensed driver of 21 years of age or older. A 16-year-old licensee may be able to drive unsupervised with permission. However, between 12 am and 6 am, 16-year-olds need supervision unless performing necessary activities. According to the National Safety Council, other states follow similar types of restrictions.

Alaska
The State of Alaska issues to new drivers an Instruction Permit at or over the age of 14 with period of validity of 2 years with only one renewal possible. A special instruction permit may be issued to those persons enrolled in an approved high school,  community  college,  commercial  driver  training  course,  or  approved  medical  program. With an Instruction Permit a new driver may driver with a supervising driver if the supervising driver is 21 or over and has at least 1 year of experience in that type or class of vehicle. At the age of 16 a driver with an Instruction Permit may apply for a Provisional License, to obtain it the driver must not having received a traffic conviction within the last 6 months, and if under the age of 18, the driver must have had the Instructional Permit for 6 months prior to obtaining the Provisional License and have a parent, legal guardian, or employer certify the driver has had 40 hours of experience and 10 of those hours must be during "progressively challenging circumstances". If under the age of 18 a driver with a Provisional License are under the following restrictions:
 May not carry passengers unless
 One of the passengers is a parent
 Legal guardian 
 Passenger is at least 21 years of age. 
 May carry passengers, without a parent in the vehicle, if they are siblings.
 May not operate a motor vehicle between the hours of 1:00 am and 5:00 am unless accompanied by
 A parent
 Legal  guardian 
 A person  at  least  21  years  of  age  who  is licensed to drive the class of vehicle being used.
 May operate a motor vehicle between the hours of 1:00am and 5:00am to or from your place  of  employment  or  within  the  scope  of  your  employment  and  driving  is  along  the most direct route.
A driver may apply for a non-Provisional License if they are older than 18 or have held a Provisional License for 6 months, have not received a traffic offence or been convicted on multiple instances of a minor consuming alcohol.

Arizona
The State of Arizona issues to new drivers a Graduated Instruction Permit at or over the age of 15 years 6 months, with a Graduated Instruction Permit the driver must have a licensed driver of at least 21 years of age. At 16 years old a Driver can obtain a Class G (Graduated) Drivers License, after completing 20 hours of daytime driving and 10 hours of nighttime driving, along with holding a Graduated Instruction Permit for 6 months. 
A driver with a Class G Drivers License for the first 6 months cannot:
 Drive between midnight and 5 am unless
 a parent or legal guardian with a valid Class A, B, C or D license is in the front passenger seat
 is driving from or to a
 sanctioned school sponsored activity
 sanctioned religious activity
 place of employment 
 family emergency
 Drive one or more passengers under the age of 18 unless
 Passenger(/s) are the drivers sibling(/s)
 a parent or legal guardian with a valid Class A, B, C or D license is in the front passenger seat
At 18 years old a Driver may apply for a Class D (non-Graduated) license.

Arkansas
The State of Arkansas uses an age-based graduated licensing system, drivers who start over the age of 18 are not required to have had a Learner's License or an Intermediate License and can get a Class D License after completing an Instruction Permit.

Missouri
All first-time drivers between 15 and 18 years old must follow Missouri's Graduated Driver License law.

New Jersey
New Jersey residents who have never had a driver license must follow New Jersey's Graduated Driver License (GDL) program to get their
first unrestricted basic driver license. The GDL is designed to give new drivers increased, step-by-step instruction and driving experience on the road to obtaining a basic driver license. The GDL has been proven to save lives among new drivers and their passengers.

Oceania

Australia

Graduated Driver Licensing (GDL) first commenced in Australia in the mid-1960s with New South Wales introducing provisional licences on 4 January 1966. Learner licences had been in use since 1952. The provisional phase was for 12 months and had 40 mph speed restriction. Today in all Australian states, newly licensed drivers are required by law to display P-plates for varying lengths of time. The P is usually a red or green letter on a white background or a white letter on a red or green background (Victoria & Western Australia only). In New South Wales and Victoria there are two classes of provisional licence, red P-plates are for the first year after passing the Learner test and then after passing a computerised test, they are green for two to three years. Western Australia requires six months of red P-plates, where provisional drivers are under a 12 am – 5 am curfew, and one and a half years of green P-plates.

On 1 July 2000, New South Wales introduced a three-stage Graduated Licensing Scheme (GLS).

 Stage one is a learner licence with the requirement to complete 50 hours of supervised driving (increased to 120 hours 1 July 2007). 
 Stage two is a one-year P1 probationary licence (with red P plates). 
 Stage three is a three-year P2 probationary licence (with green P plates).

On 1 July 2010, Victoria introduced the Graduated Licensing Systems (GLS).

 Stage one is a one-year P1 probationary licence (with red P plates). 
 Stage two is a three-year P2 probationary licence (with green P plates). 
 P1 drivers are prohibited from using a mobile phone of any kind, are banned from towing, except for work or when supervised and can carry no more than one passenger aged between 16 years of age and less than 22 years, unless the passengers are immediate family members.

A good driving record will be necessary to progress to the next licence stage.

As of July 2007, newly issued Queensland drivers licences have new restrictions for those under 25. Learners must first log 100 hours of driving experience (of which 10 must be undertaken at night) before taking their practical driving examination. Learners can boost this experience by taking professional lessons which count for 3 times the hours, for up to 10 hours (or 30 logbook hours.) After a period of one year, provisional drivers must then pass a hazard-perception test to move from red to green P-Plates where previously only a 3-year duration was required. New restrictions also prevent any under-25, Queensland provisional licence-holder from carrying more than one passenger under the age of 21, who is not an immediate family member, between the hours of 11 pm and 5 am.

New Zealand

New Zealand has had a graduated driver licence system since 1987. The process of obtaining a full light vehicle driver licence in New Zealand is:
 Theory test at a minimum age of 16.
 Learner licence: 6 months
 Practical test at a minimum age of 16 years 6 months
 Restricted licence: 12 months (with advanced driving course) or 18 months (without advanced driving course)
 Practical test at a minimum age of 17 years 6 months or 18 years, depending on whether the driver passes an advanced driving course.

References

Driving licences
Road safety